Nitrotriazolone (NTO) is a heterocyclic ketone high explosive first identified in 1905, but research into its explosive properties was not conducted until the 1980s. NTO is currently being used by the US Army in munitions, specifically Insensitive munitions replacing those made with legacy explosives.

Nitrotriazolone is being progressively made use of in novel explosive formulations, such as IMX-101, a new, safer alternative to TNT specially devised in 2010 by BAE Systems, where it is combined with 2,4-Dinitroanisole and Nitroguanidine. As such, NTO is found in the vast majority of IMX formulations. The Picatinny Arsenal has also adopted the implementation of NTO and DNAN in many of their likewise newly developed insensitive explosive mixtures, which share many of the same applications of the IMXs.

Properties 
Nitrotriazolone shows keto–enol tautomerism through proton transfer reactions. The keto form shows significantly different stability to heat, friction, and impact.

Nitrotriazolone can form either mono or a di hydrate.

Preparation 
NTO was first made in 1905 in a two step process. Semicarbazide hydrochloride is condensed with formic acid to produce 1,2,4-triazol-3-one, which is nitrated with nitric acid to form nitrotriazolone.

Toxicity 
In vivo studies showed the nitrotriazolone is absorbed through the skin and gastrointestinal tract. In the kidneys, NTO is broken down into 5-amino-1,2,4-triazol-3-one, which undergoes oxidative denitrification and forms urazoles and nitrites in rats.

References 

Explosive chemicals
Nitro compounds